State Road 77 (NM 77) is a state highway in the US state of New Mexico. NM 77's western terminus is at NM 209 in Clovis, and the eastern terminus is at FM 2290 at the Texas / New Mexico border.

Major intersections

See also

References

077
Transportation in Curry County, New Mexico